Luke Parker (born 27 September 1983) is an English cricketer. He is a right-handed batsman and a right-arm medium-pace bowler.

Born in Coventry, and having previously played for Oxford UCCE and British Universities, he has come through the ranks to play for Warwickshire, for whom he is soon hoping to make an impact in the side.

External links
Luke Parker at CricketArchive

1983 births
Living people
Cricketers from Coventry
English cricketers
Warwickshire Cricket Board cricketers
Oxford MCCU cricketers
Warwickshire cricketers
Marylebone Cricket Club cricketers
British Universities cricketers